Buchanania insignis is a tree of Borneo in the cashew and sumac family Anacardiaceae. The specific epithet  is from the Latin meaning "remarkable".

Description
Its smooth bark is grey-white. The flowers are white.

Distribution and habitat
Buchanania insignis grows naturally in Borneo and the Philippines. Its habitat is lowland forests, sometimes tidal swamps, from sea-level to  altitude.

References

insignis
Trees of Borneo
Trees of the Philippines
Plants described in 1850